Ulysses Near Arnett (November 7, 1820 – December 1, 1880) was the Democratic President of the West Virginia Senate from Marion County and served from 1877 to 1879. He drowned in 1880.

References

West Virginia state senators
Presidents of the West Virginia State Senate
1820 births
1880 deaths
19th-century American politicians
People from Marion County, West Virginia